Wangtan is a town in Laoting County, in northeastern Hebei province, China.

See also
List of township-level divisions of Hebei

References 

Township-level divisions of Hebei
Laoting County